Christine "Sally" Beauchamp was the pseudonym of a woman, actually named Clara Norton Fowler, studied by American neurologist Morton Prince  between 1898 and 1904. She was one of the first persons diagnosed as having multiple personalities (a disorder now termed dissociative identity disorder). Prince reported her case in his 1906 book-length description of her disorder.

History
Beauchamp was a 23-year-old student who came to Prince, a Boston neurologist, because she was suffering from a "nervous disorder". Her alternate personalities first appeared under hypnotherapy but later appeared spontaneously. Prince was active in naming the personalities and in expressing a preference for one of them. Prince "cured" her by reconciling her other personalities with the original one. Beauchamp later married one of Prince's assistants.

Prince described Beauchamp as having three main distinct personalities, each of which had differing degrees of knowledge of the others. He wrote: "although making use of the same body, each ... has a distinctly different character ... manifested by different trains of thought, ... views, beliefs, ideals, and temperament, and by different acquisitions, tastes, habits, experiences, and memories..."

Importance
This case was widely cited as the "prototypical case" of dissociative identity disorder, even into the 1970s.

References

External links
 The dissociation of a personality; a biographical study in abnormal psychology (1906) on the Internet Archive.

Year of birth missing
Place of birth missing
Year of death missing
Place of death missing
People with dissociative identity disorder